Sir Alfred Claud Hollis  (12 May 1874 – 22 November 1961) was British administrator who served as British Resident to the Sultan of Zanzibar between 1923 and 1929 and Governor of Trinidad and Tobago between 1930 and 1936 and author of a historical account of Spanish Trinidad.

Education and career
Hollis was born in Highgate, London, and was privately educated in England, Switzerland and Germany.

He worked for a commercial company in German East Africa (1893–96) and in 1897 he was appointed assistant collector in the British East Africa Protectorate. He wrote pioneering works on the Maasai (1905) and the Nandi people (1908). During his time in East Africa he took part in numerous expeditions including the Uganda Mutiny (1897–98) and the Jubaland Expedition (1900–01). Between 1901 and 1907 he worked as Secretary to the East Africa Protectorate administration, and was Secretary for Native Affairs between 1907–1913.

In 1913, Hollis took up the post of colonial secretary in Sierra Leone, and in 1920 he was appointed chief secretary in Tanganyika. In 1924 he became British Resident Minister in Zanzibar.

In 1930 Hollis was made governor of Trinidad, holding that post until his retirement in 1936. He came into conflict with Arthur Andrew Cipriani over the transfer of the electric works to the authority of the Port of Spain City Corporation.

Hollis died at the age of 87 in Cambridge.

Pitt Rivers Museum controversy 
In 2017 Maasai activist Samwel Nangiria discovered that many Maasai objects donated by Hollis to the Pitt Rivers Museum  had been mislabelled and likely either stolen and taken by the Maasai under coercion. After this discovery the museum's director Laura Van Broekhoven worked in collaboration with Maasai activists and academics to relabel and recontextualise the Pitt River's Maasai collections.

References

 

Governors of Trinidad and Tobago
Knights Grand Cross of the Order of St Michael and St George
Commanders of the Order of the British Empire
Ambassadors to Zanzibar
1874 births
1961 deaths
Resident ministers of Zanzibar
British Kenya people